The Domžale Tigers are an American football team from Domžale, Slovenia. Their home games are played at the Domžale Sports Park.

Honours
 Slovenian Football League
Champions: 2019
 Third place: 2017

References

External links
Official website 

American football teams in Slovenia
2013 establishments in Slovenia
American football teams established in 2013